This is a list of fellows of the Royal Society elected in 1714.

Fellows
 Nicholas Bernoulli (1687–1759)
 William Brattle (1662–1715)
 Thomas Bromfield (c. 1678–1722)
 John Theophilus Desaguliers (1683–1744)
 Martin Folkes (1690–1754)
 Thomas Jett (d. 1730)
 Robert Keck (c. 1686–1719)
 John Leveret (1662–1724)
 Alexander Danilovich Menicoff (? 1673–?1729)
 Richard Rawlinson (1690–1755)
 Johann Georg Steigertahl (c. 1667–c. 1740)
 Alexander Stuart (c. 1673–1742)
 Edmond Turner (fl. 1710–1722)
 Pierre Varignon (1654–1722)
 Thomas Watkins (fl. 1714–1729)

References

1714
1714 in science
1714 in England